Demta may be,

Demta language
Achaea demta (sp. moth)